In microbiology, a culture plate is a low flat-bottomed laboratory container for growing a layer of organisms such as bacteria, molds, and cells on a thin layer of nutrient medium. The most common types are the petri dish and multiwell plates.

See also
Roux culture bottle
Inoculation loop
Test tube

References

Microbiology equipment